Plataies, anciently Kokhla, is a village and a former municipality in Boeotia, Greece. Since the 2011 local government reform it is part of the municipality Thebes, of which it is a municipal unit. The municipal unit has an area of 172.533 km2, the community 37.321 km2. Population 4,908 (2011). The seat of the former municipality was in Kaparelli.

The village is next to the ruins of the ancient city of Plataea and near the site of the Battle of Plataea.

See also 
 Plataea
 Battle of Plataea

References

Populated places in Boeotia